The 2000 Campeonato Ecuatoriano de Fútbol de la Serie A was the 42nd season of the Serie A, the top level of professional football in Ecuador. The season was won by Olmedo, who became the first team outside of Quito and Guayaquil to win a national title.

First stage

Second stage

Aggregate table

Liguilla Final

External links
2000 season on RSSSF

2000
Ecu
Football